The 2013 Arena Football League season was the 26th season in the history of the league. The regular season began on March 23, 2013, with a five-game slate, the first of which to kick off being between the Utah Blaze and the Pittsburgh Power, and ended on July 27, 2013, with the Utah Blaze and Cleveland Gladiators as the last game to kick off. The Arizona Rattlers defeated the Philadelphia Soul by a 48–39 score in ArenaBowl XXVI to conclude the league's playoffs.

League business

Teams
The league dropped to 14 teams during the offseason. The Kansas City Command ceased operations on August 23, 2012, as well as the Georgia Force on October 14, 2012. The Milwaukee Mustangs suspended operations for 2013, eyeing a return to play in the 2014 season.

Television
It was announced on November 13, 2012, that the league had reached an agreement with CBS Sports Network to air 19 regular-season games, as well as two playoff games. The network was scheduled to air the league's "game of the week" each Saturday. The main CBS network was to televise ArenaBowl XXVI on August 17, 2013.

Regular season standings

Eight teams qualify for the playoffs: four teams from each conference, of which two are division champions and the other two have the best records of the teams remaining.

Key:  •  •

Tie-breakers
 Cleveland finished in second place in the East Division based on their greater point differential in head-to-head competition with Pittsburgh.
 Jacksonville clinched the American Conference's No. 1 seed based on their win over Philadelphia.
 Orlando clinched the American Conference's No. 3 seed based on a greater conference record than Tampa Bay.
 Chicago clinched the Central Division based on their greater point differential in games against common opponents with San Antonio.

Playoffs

Note: Due to "arena conflicts," the Chicago Rush did not host the playoff game.

Conference semifinals

Conference championships

ArenaBowl XXVI

All-Arena team

References